The avifauna of Honduras included a total of 766 species as of July 2022, according to La Asociación Hondureña de Ornitología (ASHO). Between that date and August 2021, an additional 30 species have been added from Bird Checklists of the World and one as a result of a split.

Of the 797 species listed here, one of them, the Honduran emerald, is endemic. Fifty-four are rare or accidental and five have been introduced by humans. Five species are hypothetical (see below) and a few have insufficient information to classify. Some of the "hypothetical" species have more recent eBird records with photographs. Two species have possibly been extirpated. Sixteen species are globally vulnerable or endangered.

This list is presented in the taxonomic sequence of the Check-list of North and Middle American Birds, 7th edition through the 63rd Supplement, published by the American Ornithological Society (AOS). Common and scientific names are also those of the Check-list, except that the common names of families are from the Clements taxonomy because the AOS list does not include them.

Unless otherwise noted, the species on this list are considered to occur regularly in Honduras as permanent residents, summer or winter visitors, or migrants. The following tags are used by ASHO to highlight several categories of occurrence.

(A) Accidental - a species that rarely or accidentally occurs in Honduras
(E) Endemic - a species endemic to Honduras
(I) Introduced - a species introduced to Honduras as a consequence, direct or indirect, of human actions
(H) Hypothetical - a species recorded but with no tangible evidence such as a photograph, according to the ASHO
(?) Insufficient information - Appended to a tag or note because of uncertainty

Tinamous
Order: TinamiformesFamily: Tinamidae

The tinamous are one of the most ancient groups of bird. Although they look similar to other ground-dwelling birds like quail and grouse, they have no close relatives and are classified as a single family, Tinamidae, within their own order, the Tinamiformes. They are distantly related to the ratites (order Struthioniformes), that includes the rheas, emu, and kiwi.

Great tinamou, Tinamus major (Near-threatened)
Little tinamou, Crypturellus soui
Thicket tinamou, Crypturellus cinnamomeus
Slaty-breasted tinamou, Crypturellus boucardi

Ducks, geese, and waterfowl

Order: AnseriformesFamily: Anatidae

The family Anatidae includes the ducks and most duck-like waterfowl, such as geese and swans. These are birds adapted to an aquatic existence with webbed feet, flattened bills, and feathers that are excellent at shedding water due to an oily coating.

Black-bellied whistling-duck, Dendrocygna autumnalis
Fulvous whistling-duck, Dendrocygna bicolor
Snow goose, Anser caerulescens (A)
Brant, Branta bernicla (A)
Canada goose, Branta canadensis (A?) (H?)
Muscovy duck, Cairina moschata
Blue-winged teal, Spatula discors
Cinnamon teal, Spatula cyanoptera
Northern shoveler, Spatula clypeata
Gadwall, Mareca strepera (A)
American wigeon, Mareca americana
Mallard, Anas platyrhynchos (A)
White-cheeked pintail, Anas bahamensis (A)
Northern pintail, Anas acuta
Green-winged teal, Anas crecca
Canvasback, Aythya valisineria
Redhead, Aythya americana (A)
Ring-necked duck, Aythya collaris
Lesser scaup, Aythya affinis
Red-breasted merganser, Mergus serrator (A)
Masked duck, Nomonyx dominicus
Ruddy duck, Oxyura jamaicensis

Guans, chachalacas, and curassows

Order: GalliformesFamily: Cracidae

The Cracidae are large birds, similar in general appearance to turkeys. The guans and curassows live in trees, but the smaller chachalacas are found in more open scrubby habitats. They are generally dull-plumaged, but the curassows and some guans have colorful facial ornaments.

Plain chachalaca, Ortalis vetula
Gray-headed chachalaca, Ortalis cinereiceps
White-bellied chachalaca, Ortalis leucogastra
Crested guan, Penelope purpurascens
Highland guan, Penelopina nigra (Vulnerable)
Great curassow, Crax rubra (Vulnerable)

New World quail

Order: GalliformesFamily: Odontophoridae

The New World quails are small, plump terrestrial birds only distantly related to the quails of the Old World, but named for their similar appearance and habits.

Tawny-faced quail, Rhynchortyx cinctus
Buffy-crowned wood-partridge, Dendrortyx leucophrys
Black-throated bobwhite, Colinus nigrogularis
Crested bobwhite, Colinus cristatus
Ocellated quail, Cyrtonyx ocellatus (Vulnerable)
Singing quail, Dactylortyx thoracicus
Black-eared wood-quail, Odontophorus melanotis
Spotted wood-quail, Odontophorus guttatus

Flamingos

Order: PhoenicopteriformesFamily: Phoenicopteridae

Flamingos filter-feed on shellfish and algae. Their oddly shaped beaks are specially adapted to separate mud and silt from the food they consume and, uniquely, are used upside-down.

American flamingo, Phoenicopterus ruber (A?) (H?)

Grebes

Order: PodicipediformesFamily: Podicipedidae

Grebes are small to medium-large freshwater diving birds. They have lobed toes and are excellent swimmers and divers. However, they have their feet placed far back on the body, making them quite ungainly on land.

Least grebe, Tachybaptus dominicus
Pied-billed grebe, Podilymbus podiceps

Pigeons and doves
Order: ColumbiformesFamily: Columbidae

Pigeons and doves are stout-bodied birds with short necks and short slender bills with a fleshy cere.

Rock pigeon, Columba livia (I)
Pale-vented pigeon, Patagioenas cayennensis
Scaled pigeon, Patagioenas speciosa
White-crowned pigeon, Patagioenas leucocephala (Near-threatened)
Red-billed pigeon, Patagioenas flavirostris
Band-tailed pigeon, Patagioenas fasciata
Short-billed pigeon, Patagioenas nigrirostris
Eurasian collared-dove, Streptopelia decaocto (I)
Inca dove, Columbina inca
Common ground dove, Columbina passerina
Plain-breasted ground dove, Columbina minuta
Ruddy ground dove, Columbina talpacoti
Blue ground dove, Claravis pretiosa
Maroon-chested ground dove, Paraclaravis mondetoura
Ruddy quail-dove, Geotrygon montana
White-tipped dove, Leptotila verreauxi
Caribbean dove, Leptotila jamaicensis
Gray-chested dove, Leptotila cassinii
Gray-headed dove, Leptotila plumbeiceps
White-faced quail-dove, Zentrygon albifacies
White-winged dove, Zenaida asiatica
Mourning dove, Zenaida macroura

Cuckoos
Order: CuculiformesFamily: Cuculidae

The family Cuculidae includes cuckoos, roadrunners, and anis. These birds are of variable size with slender bodies, long tails, and strong legs.

Smooth-billed ani, Crotophaga ani
Groove-billed ani, Crotophaga sulcirostris
Striped cuckoo, Tapera naevia
Pheasant cuckoo, Dromococcyx phasianellus
Lesser ground-cuckoo, Morococcyx erythropygus
Lesser roadrunner, Geococcyx velox
Rufous-vented ground-cuckoo, Neomorphus geoffroyi 
Squirrel cuckoo, Piaya cayana
Yellow-billed cuckoo, Coccyzus americanus
Mangrove cuckoo, Coccyzus minor
Black-billed cuckoo, Coccyzus erythropthalmus

Nightjars and allies
Order: CaprimulgiformesFamily: Caprimulgidae

Nightjars are medium-sized nocturnal birds that usually nest on the ground. They have long wings, short legs, and very short bills. Most have small feet, of little use for walking, and long pointed wings. Their soft plumage is camouflaged to resemble bark or leaves.

Short-tailed nighthawk, Lurocalis semitorquatus
Lesser nighthawk, Chordeiles acutipennis
Common nighthawk, Chordeiles minor
Antillean nighthawk, Chordeiles gundlachii (A)
Common pauraque, Nyctidromus albicollis
Ocellated poorwill, Nyctiphrynus ocellatus
Chuck-will's-widow, Antrostomus carolinensis (Near-threatened)
Yucatan nightjar, Antrostmus badius
Buff-collared nightjar, Antrostomus ridgwayi
Eastern whip-poor-will, Antrostomus vociferus (Near-threatened)
Mexican whip-poor-will, Antrostomus arizonae
Spot-tailed nightjar, Hydropsalis maculicaudus

Potoos
Order: NyctibiiformesFamily: Nyctibiidae

The potoos (sometimes called poor-me-ones) are large near passerine birds related to the nightjars and frogmouths. They are nocturnal insectivores which lack the bristles around the mouth found in the true nightjars.

Great potoo, Nyctibius grandis
Northern potoo, Nyctibius jamaicensis

Swifts
Order: ApodiformesFamily: Apodidae

Swifts are small birds which spend the majority of their lives flying. These birds have very short legs and never settle voluntarily on the ground, perching instead only on vertical surfaces. Many swifts have long swept-back wings which resemble a crescent or boomerang.

Black swift, Cypseloides niger (Vulnerable)
White-chinned swift, Cypseloides cryptus
Chestnut-collared swift, Streptoprocne rutila
White-collared swift, Streptoprocne zonaris
Gray-rumped swift, Chaetura cinereiventris
Chimney swift, Chaetura pelagica (Vulnerable)
Vaux's swift, Chaetura vauxi
White-throated swift, Aeronautes saxatalis
Lesser swallow-tailed swift, Panyptila cayennensis
Great swallow-tailed swift, Panyptila sanctihieronymi

Hummingbirds

Order: ApodiformesFamily: Trochilidae

Hummingbirds are small birds capable of hovering in mid-air due to the rapid flapping of their wings. They are the only birds that can fly backwards.

White-necked jacobin, Florisuga mellivora
Bronzy hermit, Glaucis aenea
Band-tailed barbthroat, Threnetes ruckeri
Long-billed hermit, Phaethornis longirostris
Stripe-throated hermit, Phaethornis striigularis
Brown violetear, Colibri delphinae
Mexican violetear, Colibri thalassinus (The ASHO retains the pre-split name of green violetear)
Purple-crowned fairy, Heliothryx barroti
Green-breasted mango, Anthracothorax prevostii
Black-crested coquette, Lophornis helenae
Rivoli's hummingbird, Eugenes fulgens
Long-billed starthroat, Heliomaster longirostris
Plain-capped starthroat, Heliomaster constantii
Green-throated mountain-gem, Lampornis viridipallens
Green-breasted mountain-gem, Lampornis sybillae
Amethyst-throated mountain-gem, Lampornis amethystinus
Garnet-throated hummingbird, Lamprolaima rhami
Slender sheartail, Doricha enicura
Sparkling-tailed hummingbird, Tilmatura dupontii
Ruby-throated hummingbird, Archilochus colubris
Wine-throated hummingbird, Selasphorus ellioti
Canivet's emerald, Cynanthus canivetii
White-eared hummingbird, Basilinna leucotis
Wedge-tailed sabrewing, Pampa curvipennis
Emerald-chinned hummingbird, Abeillia abeillei
Violet-headed hummingbird, Klais guimeti
Violet sabrewing, Campylopterus hemileucurus
Bronze-tailed plumeleteer, Chalybura urochrysia
Crowned woodnymph, Thalurania colombica
Snowcap, Microchera albocoronata
Stripe-tailed hummingbird, Eupherusa eximia
Scaly-breasted hummingbird, Phaeochroa cuvierii
Green-fronted hummingbird, Leucolia viridifrons (A)
Azure-crowned hummingbird, Saucerottia cyanocephala
Blue-vented hummingbird, Saucerottia hoffmanni
Berylline hummingbird, Saucerottia beryllina
Blue-tailed hummingbird, Saucerottia cyanura
Cinnamon hummingbird, Amazilia rutila
Buff-bellied hummingbird, Amazilia yucatanensis (A)
Rufous-tailed hummingbird, Amazilia tzacatl
Honduran emerald, Polyerata luciae (E) (Endangered)
Blue-chested hummingbird, Polyerata amabilis
White-bellied emerald, Chlorestes candida
Blue-throated goldentail, Chlorestes eliciae

Rails, gallinules, and coots
Order: GruiformesFamily: Rallidae

Rallidae is a large family of small to medium-sized birds which includes the rails, crakes, coots, and gallinules. Typically they inhabit dense vegetation in damp environments near lakes, swamps, or rivers. In general they are shy and secretive birds, making them difficult to observe. Most species have strong legs and long toes which are well adapted to soft uneven surfaces. They tend to have short, rounded wings and to be weak fliers.

Spotted rail, Pardirallus maculatus
Uniform crake, Amaurolimnas concolor
Rufous-necked wood-rail, Aramides axillaris
Russet-naped wood-rail, Aramides albiventris
Mangrove rail, Rallus longirostris
Sora, Porzana carolina
Common gallinule, Gallinula galeata
American coot, Fulica americana
Purple gallinule, Porphyrio martinicus
Yellow-breasted crake, Haplocrex flaviventer
Ruddy crake, Laterallus ruber
White-throated crake, Laterallus albigularis
Gray-breasted crake, Laterallus exilis
Black rail, Laterallus jamaicensis

Finfoots
Order: GruiformesFamily: Heliornithidae

Heliornithidae is a small family of tropical birds with webbed lobes on their feet similar to those of grebes and coots.

Sungrebe, Heliornis fulica

Limpkin

Order: GruiformesFamily: Aramidae

The limpkin resembles a large rail. It has drab-brown plumage and a grayer head and neck.

Limpkin, Aramus guarauna

Thick-knees

Order: CharadriiformesFamily: Burhinidae

The thick-knees are a group of waders in the family Burhinidae. They are found worldwide within the tropical zone, with some species also breeding in temperate Europe and Australia. They are medium to large waders with strong black or yellow-black bills, large yellow eyes, and cryptic plumage. Despite being classed as waders, most species have a preference for arid or semi-arid habitats.

Double-striped thick-knee, Burhinus bistriatus

Stilts and avocets
Order: CharadriiformesFamily: Recurvirostridae

Recurvirostridae is a family of large wading birds which includes the avocets and stilts. The avocets have long legs and long up-curved bills. The stilts have extremely long legs and long, thin, straight bills.

Black-necked stilt, Himantopus mexicanus
American avocet, Recurvirostra americana

Oystercatchers

Order: CharadriiformesFamily: Haematopodidae

The oystercatchers are large and noisy plover-like birds with strong bills used for smashing or prising open molluscs.

American oystercatcher, Haematopus palliatus

Plovers and lapwings
Order: CharadriiformesFamily: Charadriidae

The family Charadriidae includes the plovers, dotterels, and lapwings. They are small to medium-sized birds with compact bodies, short thick necks, and long, usually pointed, wings. They are found in open country worldwide, mostly in habitats near water.

Southern lapwing, Vanellus chilensis (A)
Black-bellied plover, Pluvialis squatarola
American golden-plover, Pluvialis dominica
Killdeer, Charadrius vociferus
Semipalmated plover, Charadrius semipalmatus
Piping plover, Charadrius melodus (A) (Near-threatened)
Wilson's plover, Charadrius wilsonia
Collared plover, Charadrius collaris
Snowy plover, Charadrius nivosus (Near-threatened)

Jacanas

Order: CharadriiformesFamily: Jacanidae

The jacanas are a group of waders in the family Jacanidae which are found throughout the tropics. They are identifiable by their huge feet and claws which enable them to walk on floating vegetation in the shallow lakes which are their preferred habitat.

Northern jacana, Jacana spinosa

Sandpipers and allies

Order: CharadriiformesFamily: Scolopacidae

Scolopacidae is a large diverse family of small to medium-sized shorebirds including the sandpipers, curlews, godwits, shanks, tattlers, woodcocks, snipes, dowitchers, and phalaropes. The majority of these species eat small invertebrates picked out of the mud or soil. Variation in length of legs and bills enables multiple species to feed in the same habitat, particularly on the coast, without direct competition for food.

Upland sandpiper, Bartramia longicauda
Whimbrel, Numenius phaeopus
Long-billed curlew, Numenius americanus
Hudsonian godwit, Limosa haemastica (A)
Marbled godwit, Limosa fedoa
Ruddy turnstone, Arenaria interpres
Red knot, Calidris canutus (Near-threatened)
Surfbird, Calidris virgata (A)
Stilt sandpiper, Calidris himantopus
Sanderling, Calidris alba
Baird's sandpiper, Calidris bairdii
Least sandpiper, Calidris minutilla
White-rumped sandpiper, Calidris fuscicollis
Buff-breasted sandpiper, Calidris subruficollis (Near-threatened)
Pectoral sandpiper, Calidris melanotos
Semipalmated sandpiper, Calidris pusilla (Near-threatened)
Western sandpiper, Calidris mauri
Short-billed dowitcher, Limnodromus griseus
Long-billed dowitcher, Limnodromus scolopaceus
Wilson's snipe, Gallinago delicata
Spotted sandpiper, Actitis macularia
Solitary sandpiper, Tringa solitaria
Wandering tattler, Tringa incana
Lesser yellowlegs, Tringa flavipes
Willet, Tringa semipalmata
Greater yellowlegs, Tringa melanoleuca
Wilson's phalarope, Phalaropus tricolor
Red-necked phalarope, Phalaropus lobatus (A)

Skuas and jaegers
Order: CharadriiformesFamily: Stercorariidae

The family Stercorariidae are, in general, medium to large birds, typically with gray or brown plumage, often with white markings on the wings. They nest on the ground in temperate and arctic regions and are long-distance migrants.

Pomarine jaeger, Stercorarius pomarinus
Parasitic jaeger, Stercorarius parasiticus
Long-tailed jaeger, Stercorarius longicaudus

Gulls, terns, and skimmers

Order: CharadriiformesFamily: Laridae

Laridae is a family of medium to large seabirds and includes gulls, kittiwakes, terns, and skimmers. They are typically gray or white, often with black markings on the head or wings. They have longish bills and webbed feet. Terns are a group of generally medium to large seabirds typically with gray or white plumage, often with black markings on the head. Most terns hunt fish by diving but some pick insects off the surface of fresh water. Terns are generally long-lived birds, with several species known to live in excess of 30 years. Skimmers are a small family of tropical tern-like birds. They have an elongated lower mandible which they use to feed by flying low over the water surface and skimming the water for small fish.

Sabine's gull, Xema sabini (A)
Bonaparte's gull, Chroicocephalus philadelphia (A)
Laughing gull, Leucophaeus atricilla (A)
Franklin's gull, Leucophaeus pipixcan
Heermann's gull, Larus heermanni (A)
Ring-billed gull, Larus delawarensis
Western gull, Larus occidentalis (A)
California gull, Larus californicus (A)
Herring gull, Larus argentatus
Lesser black-backed gull, Larus fuscus (A)
Kelp gull, Larus dominicanus (A)
Brown noddy, Anous stolidus
Black noddy, Anous minutus
Sooty tern, Onychoprion fuscata (A)
Bridled tern, Onychoprion anaethetus
Least tern, Sternula antillarum
Large-billed tern, Phaetusa simplex (A)
Gull-billed tern, Gelochelidon nilotica
Caspian tern, Hydroprogne caspia
Black tern, Chlidonias niger
Roseate tern, Sterna dougallii
Common tern, Sterna hirundo
Arctic tern, Sterna paradisaea (A)
Forster's tern, Sterna forsteri
Royal tern, Thalasseus maxima
Sandwich tern, Thalasseus sandvicensis
Elegant tern, Thalasseus elegans (Near-threatened)
Black skimmer, Rynchops niger

Tropicbirds
Order: PhaethontiformesFamily: Phaethontidae

Tropicbirds are slender white birds of tropical oceans, with exceptionally long central tail feathers. Their long wings have black markings, as does the head.

White-tailed tropicbird, Phaethon lepturus (A)

Sunbittern
Order: EurypygiformesFamily: Eurypygidae

The sunbittern is a bittern-like bird of tropical regions of the Americas and the sole member of the family Eurypygidae (sometimes spelled Eurypigidae) and genus Eurypyga.

Sunbittern, Eurypyga helias

Northern storm-petrels
Order: ProcellariiformesFamily: Hydrobatidae

The storm-petrels are relatives of the petrels and are the smallest seabirds. They feed on planktonic crustaceans and small fish picked from the surface, typically while hovering. The flight is fluttering and sometimes bat-like.

Wedge-rumped storm-petrel, Hydrobates tethys (A)
Black storm-petrel, Hydrobates melania (A)
Least storm-petrel, Hydrobates microsoma (A)

Shearwaters and petrels
Order: ProcellariiformesFamily: Procellariidae

The procellariids are the main group of medium-sized "true petrels", characterized by united nostrils with medium septum and a long outer functional primary.

Cory's shearwater, Calonectris diomedea (A)
Great shearwater, Ardenna gravis (A)
Audubon's shearwater, Puffinus lherminieri (A)

Storks

Order: CiconiiformesFamily: Ciconiidae

Storks are large, long-legged, long-necked wading birds with long, stout bills. Storks are mute, but bill-clattering is an important mode of communication at the nest. Their nests can be large and may be reused for many years. Many species are migratory.

Jabiru, Jabiru mycteria
Wood stork, Mycteria americana

Frigatebirds
Order: SuliformesFamily: Fregatidae

Frigatebirds are large seabirds usually found over tropical oceans. They are large, black-and-white, or completely black, with long wings and deeply forked tails. The males have colored inflatable throat pouches. They do not swim or walk and cannot take off from a flat surface. Having the largest wingspan-to-body-weight ratio of any bird, they are essentially aerial, able to stay aloft for more than a week.

Magnificent frigatebird, Fregata magnificens

Boobies and gannets

Order: SuliformesFamily: Sulidae

The sulids comprise the gannets and boobies. Both groups are medium to large coastal seabirds that plunge-dive for fish.

Masked booby, Sula dactylatra
Blue-footed booby, Sula nebouxii
Brown booby, Sula leucogaster
Red-footed booby, Sula sula (A)

Anhingas
Order: SuliformesFamily: Anhingidae

Anhingas are often called "snake-birds" because of their long thin neck, which gives a snake-like appearance when they swim with their bodies submerged. The males have black and dark-brown plumage, an erectile crest on the nape, and a larger bill than the female. The females have much paler plumage especially on the neck and underparts. The anhingas have completely webbed feet and their legs are short and set far back on the body. Their plumage is somewhat permeable, like that of cormorants, and they spread their wings to dry after diving.

Anhinga, Anhinga anhinga

Cormorants and shags
Order: SuliformesFamily: Phalacrocoracidae

Phalacrocoracidae is a family of medium to large coastal, fish-eating seabirds that includes cormorants and shags. Coloration varies, with the majority having mainly dark plumage, some species being black-and-white, and a few being colorful.

Double-crested cormorant, Nannopterum auritum (A)
Neotropic cormorant, Nannopterum brasilianum

Pelicans

Order: PelecaniformesFamily: Pelecanidae

Pelicans are large water birds with a distinctive pouch under their beak. As with other members of the order Pelecaniformes, they have webbed feet with four toes.

American white pelican, Pelecanus erythrorhynchos
Brown pelican, Pelecanus occidentalis

Herons, egrets, and bitterns

Order: PelecaniformesFamily: Ardeidae

The family Ardeidae contains the bitterns, herons, and egrets. Herons and egrets are medium to large wading birds with long necks and legs. Bitterns tend to be shorter necked and more wary. Members of Ardeidae fly with their necks retracted, unlike other long-necked birds such as storks, ibises and spoonbills.

Pinnated bittern, Botaurus pinnatus
American bittern, Botaurus lentiginosus
Least bittern, Ixobrychus exilis
Rufescent tiger-heron, Tigrisoma lineatum
Fasciated tiger-heron, Tigrisoma fasciatum
Bare-throated tiger-heron, Tigrisoma mexicanum
Great blue heron, Ardea herodias
Great egret, Ardea alba
Snowy egret, Egretta thula
Little blue heron, Egretta caerulea
Tricolored heron, Egretta tricolor
Reddish egret, Egretta rufescens (Near-threatened)
Cattle egret, Bubulcus ibis
Green heron, Butorides virescens
Agami heron, Agamia agami (Vulnerable)
Black-crowned night-heron, Nycticorax nycticorax
Yellow-crowned night-heron, Nyctanassa violacea
Boat-billed heron, Cochlearius cochlearius

Ibises and spoonbills

Order: PelecaniformesFamily: Threskiornithidae

Threskiornithidae is a family of large terrestrial and wading birds which includes the ibises and spoonbills. They have long, broad wings with 11 primary and about 20 secondary feathers. They are strong fliers and despite their size and weight, very capable soarers.

White ibis, Eudocimus albus
Glossy ibis, Plegadis falcinellus
White-faced ibis, Plegadis chihi (A)
Green ibis, Mesembrinibis cayennensis
Roseate spoonbill, Platalea ajaja

New World vultures

Order: CathartiformesFamily: Cathartidae

The New World vultures are not closely related to Old World vultures, but superficially resemble them because of convergent evolution. Like the Old World vultures, they are scavengers. However, unlike Old World vultures, which find carcasses by sight, New World vultures have a good sense of smell with which they locate carrion.

King vulture, Sarcoramphus papa
Black vulture, Coragyps atratus
Turkey vulture, Cathartes aura
Lesser yellow-headed vulture, Cathartes burrovianus

Osprey

Order: AccipitriformesFamily: Pandionidae

The family Pandionidae contains only one species, the osprey. The osprey is a medium-large raptor which is a specialist fish-eater with a worldwide distribution.

Osprey, Pandion haliaetus

Hawks, eagles, and kites

Order: AccipitriformesFamily: Accipitridae

Accipitridae is a family of birds of prey, which includes hawks, eagles, kites, harriers, and Old World vultures. These birds have powerful hooked beaks for tearing flesh from their prey, strong legs, powerful talons, and keen eyesight.

Pearl kite, Gampsonyx swainsonii
White-tailed kite, Elanus leucurus
Hook-billed kite, Chondrohierax uncinatus
Gray-headed kite, Leptodon cayanensis
Swallow-tailed kite, Elanoides forficatus
Crested eagle, Morphnus guianensis (Near-threatened)
Harpy eagle, Harpia harpyja (Near-threatened)
Black hawk-eagle, Spizaetus tyrannus
Black-and-white hawk-eagle, Spizaetus melanoleucus
Ornate hawk-eagle, Spizaetus ornatus (Near-threatened)
Double-toothed kite, Harpagus bidentatus
Northern harrier, Circus hudsonius
Tiny hawk, Accipiter superciliosus (A)
Sharp-shinned hawk, Accipiter striatus
Cooper's hawk, Accipiter cooperii
Bicolored hawk, Accipiter bicolor
Mississippi kite, Ictinia mississippiensis
Plumbeous kite, Ictinia plumbea
Black-collared hawk, Busarellus nigricollis
Crane hawk, Geranospiza caerulescens
Snail kite, Rostrhamus sociabilis
Common black hawk, Buteogallus anthracinus
Great black hawk, Buteogallus urubitinga
Solitary eagle, Buteogallus solitarius (Near-threatened)
Roadside hawk, Rupornis magnirostris
Harris's hawk, Parabuteo unicinctus
White-tailed hawk, Geranoaetus albicaudatus
White hawk, Pseudastur albicollis
Semiplumbeous hawk, Leucopternis semiplumbeus
Gray hawk, Buteo plagiatus
Broad-winged hawk, Buteo platypterus
Short-tailed hawk, Buteo brachyurus
Swainson's hawk, Buteo swainsoni
Zone-tailed hawk, Buteo albonotatus
Red-tailed hawk, Buteo jamaicensis

Barn-owls

Order: StrigiformesFamily: Tytonidae

Barn-owls are medium to large owls with large heads and characteristic heart-shaped faces. They have long strong legs with powerful talons.

Barn owl, Tyto alba

Owls

Order: StrigiformesFamily: Strigidae

The typical owls are small to large solitary nocturnal birds of prey. They have large forward-facing eyes and ears, a hawk-like beak, and a conspicuous circle of feathers around each eye called a facial disk.

Whiskered screech-owl, Megascops trichopsis
Pacific screech-owl, Megascops cooperi
Middle-American screech-owl, Megascops guatemalae
Crested owl, Lophostrix cristata
Spectacled owl, Pulsatrix perspicillata
Great horned owl, Bubo virginianus
Northern pygmy-owl, Glaucidium gnoma
Central American pygmy-owl, Glaucidium griseiceps
Ferruginous pygmy-owl, Glaucidium brasilianum
Burrowing owl, Athene cunicularia (A)
Mottled owl, Strix virgata
Black-and-white owl, Strix nigrolineata
Fulvous owl, Strix fulvescens
Stygian owl, Asio stygius
Striped owl, Asio clamator
Unspotted saw-whet owl, Aegolius ridgwayi (A)

Trogons
Order: TrogoniformesFamily: Trogonidae

The family Trogonidae includes trogons and quetzals. Found in tropical woodlands worldwide, they feed on insects and fruit, and their broad bills and weak legs reflect their diet and arboreal habits. Although their flight is fast, they are reluctant to fly any distance. Trogons have soft, often colorful, feathers with distinctive male and female plumage.

Slaty-tailed trogon, Trogon massena
Black-headed trogon, Trogon melanocephalus
Gartered trogon, Trogon caligatus
Black-throated trogon, Trogon rufus
Elegant trogon, Trogon elegans
Mountain trogon, Trogon mexicanus
Collared trogon, Trogon collaris
Resplendent quetzal, Pharomachrus mocinno (Near-threatened)

Motmots
Order: CoraciiformesFamily: Momotidae

The motmots have colorful plumage and long, graduated tails which they display by waggling back and forth. In most of the species, the barbs near the ends of the two longest (central) tail feathers are weak and fall off, leaving a length of bare shaft and creating a racket-shaped tail.

Tody motmot, Hylomanes momotula
Blue-throated motmot, Aspatha gularis
Lesson's motmot, Momotus lessonii (A)
Rufous motmot, Baryphthengus martii
Keel-billed motmot, Electron carinatum (Vulnerable)
Broad-billed motmot, Electron platyrhynchum
Turquoise-browed motmot, Eumomota superciliosa

Kingfishers
Order: CoraciiformesFamily: Alcedinidae

Kingfishers are medium-sized birds with large heads, long, pointed bills, short legs, and stubby tails.

Ringed kingfisher, Megaceryle torquatus
Belted kingfisher, Megaceryle alcyon
Amazon kingfisher, Chloroceryle amazona
American pygmy kingfisher, Chloroceryle aenea
Green kingfisher, Chloroceryle americana
Green-and-rufous kingfisher, Chloroceryle inda

Puffbirds

Order: PiciformesFamily: Bucconidae

The puffbirds are related to the jacamars and have the same range, but lack the iridescent colors of that family. They are mainly brown, rufous, or gray, with large heads and flattened bills with hooked tips. The loose abundant plumage and short tails makes them look stout and puffy, giving rise to the English common name of the family.

White-necked puffbird, Notharchus hyperrhynchus
White-whiskered puffbird, Malacoptila panamensis
White-fronted nunbird, Monasa morphoeus

Jacamars
Order: PiciformesFamily: Galbulidae

The jacamars are near passerine birds from tropical South America, with a range that extends up to Mexico. They feed on insects caught on the wing, and are glossy, elegant birds with long bills and tails. In appearance and behavior they resemble the Old World bee-eaters, although they are more closely related to puffbirds.

Rufous-tailed jacamar, Galbula ruficauda
Great jacamar, Jacamerops aureus

Toucans
Order: PiciformesFamily: Ramphastidae

Toucans are near passerine birds from the Neotropics. They are brightly marked and have enormous colorful bills which in some species amount to half their body length.

Northern emerald-toucanet, Aulacorhynchus prasinus
Collared aracari, Pteroglossus torquatus
Yellow-eared toucanet, Selenidera spectabilis
Keel-billed toucan, Ramphastos sulfuratus
Yellow-throated toucan, Ramphastos ambiguus (Near-threatened)

Woodpeckers
Order: PiciformesFamily: Picidae

Woodpeckers are small to medium-sized birds with chisel-like beaks, short legs, stiff tails, and long tongues used for capturing insects. Some species have feet with two toes pointing forward and two backward, while several species have only three toes. Many woodpeckers have the habit of tapping noisily on tree trunks with their beaks.

Olivaceous piculet, Picumnus olivaceus
Acorn woodpecker, Melanerpes formicivorus
Black-cheeked woodpecker, Melanerpes pucherani
Yucatan woodpecker, Melanerpes pygmaeus
Hoffmann's woodpecker, Melanerpes hoffmannii
Golden-fronted woodpecker, Melanerpes aurifrons
Yellow-bellied sapsucker, Sphyrapicus varius
Ladder-backed woodpecker, Dryobates scalaris
Hairy woodpecker, Dryobates villosus
Smoky-brown woodpecker, Dryobates fumigatus
Rufous-winged woodpecker, Piculus simplex
Golden-olive woodpecker, Colaptes rubiginosus
Northern flicker, Colaptes auratus
Chestnut-colored woodpecker, Celeus castaneus
Lineated woodpecker, Dryocopus lineatus
Pale-billed woodpecker, Campephilus guatemalensis

Falcons and caracaras
Order: FalconiformesFamily: Falconidae

Falconidae is a family of diurnal birds of prey. They differ from hawks, eagles, and kites in that they kill with their beaks instead of their talons.

Barred forest-falcon, Micrastur ruficollis
Slaty-backed forest-falcon, Micrastur mirandollei
Collared forest-falcon, Micrastur semitorquatus
Red-throated caracara, Ibycter americanus
Crested caracara, Caracara plancus
Yellow-headed caracara, Milvago chimachima
Laughing falcon, Herpetotheres cachinnans
American kestrel, Falco sparverius
Merlin, Falco columbarius
Aplomado falcon, Falco femoralis
Bat falcon, Falco rufigularis
Orange-breasted falcon, Falco deiroleucus (Extirpated?) (Near-threatened)
Peregrine falcon, Falco peregrinus

New World and African parrots
Order: PsittaciformesFamily: Psittacidae

Parrots are small to large birds with a characteristic curved beak. Their upper mandibles have slight mobility in the joint with the skull and they have a generally erect stance. All parrots are zygodactyl, having the four toes on each foot placed two at the front and two to the back.

Olive-throated parakeet, Eupsittula nana
Orange-fronted parakeet, Eupsittula canicularis
Scarlet macaw, Ara macao
Great green macaw, Ara ambigua (Endangered)
Green parakeet, Psittacara holochlorus
Pacific parakeet, Psittacara strenuus
Crimson-fronted parakeet, Psittacara finschi (A?) (H)
Barred parakeet, Bolborhynchus lineola
Orange-chinned parakeet, Brotogeris jugularis
Brown-hooded parrot, Pionopsitta haematotis
White-crowned parrot, Pionus senilis
White-fronted parrot, Amazona albifrons
Yellow-lored parrot, Amazona xantholora
Red-lored parrot, Amazona autumnalis
Mealy parrot, Amazona farinosa
Yellow-headed parrot, Amazona oratrix (Endangered)
Yellow-naped parrot, Amazona auropalliata (Endangered)

Manakins

Order: PasseriformesFamily: Pipridae

The manakins are a clade of birds in the subtropical and tropical mainland of Central and South America, and Trinidad and Tobago. They are compact forest birds, the males typically being brightly colored, although the females of most species are duller and usually green-plumaged. Manakins feed on small fruits, berries and insects.

Long-tailed manakin, Chiroxiphia linearis
White-ruffed manakin, Corapipo altera
White-collared manakin, Manacus candei
Red-capped manakin, Ceratopipra mentalis

Cotingas
Order: PasseriformesFamily: Cotingidae

The cotingas are birds of forests or forest edges in tropical South America. Comparatively little is known about this diverse group, although all have broad bills with hooked tips, rounded wings, and strong legs. The males of many of the species are brightly colored or decorated with plumes or wattles.

Lovely cotinga, Cotinga amabilis
Rufous piha, Lipaugus unirufus
Three-wattled bellbird, Procnias tricarunculata (Vulnerable)
Snowy cotinga, Carpodectes nitidus

Tityras and allies
Order: PasseriformesFamily: Tityridae

Tityridae are suboscine passerine birds found in forest and woodland in the Neotropics. The species in this family were formerly spread over the families Tyrannidae, Pipridae, and Cotingidae. They are small to medium-sized birds. They do not have the sophisticated vocal capabilities of the songbirds. Most, but not all, have plain coloring.

Northern schiffornis, Schiffornis veraepacis
Speckled mourner, Laniocera rufescens
Masked tityra, Tityra semifasciata
Black-crowned tityra, Tityra inquisitor
Cinnamon becard, Pachyramphus cinnamomeus
White-winged becard, Pachyramphus polychopterus
Gray-collared becard, Pachyramphus major
Rose-throated becard, Pachyramphus aglaiae

Royal flycatcher and allies
Order: PasseriformesFamily: Onychorhynchidae

The members of this small family, created in 2018, were formerly considered to be tyrant flycatchers, family Tyrannidae.

Royal flycatcher, Onychorhynchus mexicanus
Ruddy-tailed flycatcher, Terenotriccus erythrurus
Sulphur-rumped flycatcher, Myiobius sulphureipygius

Tyrant flycatchers

Order: PasseriformesFamily: Tyrannidae

Tyrant flycatchers are passerine birds which occur throughout North and South America. They superficially resemble the Old World flycatchers, but are more robust and have stronger bills. They do not have the sophisticated vocal capabilities of the songbirds. Most, but not all, have plain coloring. As the name implies, most are insectivorous.

Gray-headed piprites, Piprites griseiceps (The ASHO considers P. griseiceps to be incertae sedis)
Stub-tailed spadebill, Platyrinchus cancrominus
Golden-crowned spadebill, Platyrinchus coronatus
Ochre-bellied flycatcher, Mionectes oleagineus
Sepia-capped flycatcher, Leptopogon amaurocephalus
Scale-crested pygmy-tyrant, Lophotriccus pileatus
Northern bentbill, Oncostoma cinereigulare
Slate-headed tody-flycatcher, Poecilotriccus sylvia
Common tody-flycatcher, Todirostrum cinereum
Black-headed tody-flycatcher, Todirostrum nigriceps
Eye-ringed flatbill, Rhynchocyclus brevirostris
Yellow-olive flycatcher, Tolmomyias sulphurescens
Yellow-bellied tyrannulet, Ornithion semiflavum
Northern beardless-tyrannulet, Camptostoma imberbe
Yellow tyrannulet, Capsiempis flaveola
Greenish elaenia, Myiopagis viridicata
Yellow-bellied elaenia, Elaenia flavogaster
Mountain elaenia, Elaenia frantzii
Guatemalan tyrannulet, Zimmerius vilissimus (A)
Mistletoe tyrannulet, Zimmerius parvus
Bright-rumped attila, Attila spadiceus
Rufous mourner, Rhytipterna holerythra
Sad flycatcher, Myiarchus barbirostris
Dusky-capped flycatcher, Myiarchus tuberculifer
Ash-throated flycatcher, Myiarchus cinerascens
Nutting's flycatcher, Myiarchus nuttingi
Great crested flycatcher, Myiarchus crinitus
Brown-crested flycatcher, Myiarchus tyrannulus
Great kiskadee, Pitangus sulphuratus
Boat-billed flycatcher, Megarynchus pitangua
Social flycatcher, Myiozetetes similis
Gray-capped flycatcher, Myiozetetes granadensis
White-ringed flycatcher, Conopias albovittatus
Streaked flycatcher, Myiodynastes maculatus
Sulphur-bellied flycatcher, Myiodynastes luteiventris
Piratic flycatcher, Legatus leucophaius
Tropical kingbird, Tyrannus melancholicus
Couch's kingbird, Tyrannus couchii (A)
Cassin's kingbird, Tyrannus vociferans
Western kingbird, Tyrannus verticalis
Eastern kingbird, Tyrannus tyrannus
Gray kingbird, Tyrannus dominicensis
Loggerhead kingbird, Tyrannus caudifasciatus (A)
Scissor-tailed flycatcher, Tyrannus forficatus
Fork-tailed flycatcher, Tyrannus savana
Tawny-chested flycatcher, Aphanotriccus capitalis (Vulnerable)
Belted flycatcher, Xenotriccus callizonus (Near-threatened)
Tufted flycatcher, Mitrephanes phaeocercus
Olive-sided flycatcher, Contopus cooperi (Near-threatened)
Greater pewee, Contopus pertinax
Western wood-pewee, Contopus sordidulus
Eastern wood-pewee, Contopus virens
Tropical pewee, Contopus cinereus
Yellow-bellied flycatcher, Empidonax flaviventris
Acadian flycatcher, Empidonax virescens
Alder flycatcher, Empidonax alnorum
Willow flycatcher, Empidonax traillii
White-throated flycatcher, Empidonax albigularis
Least flycatcher, Empidonax minimus
Hammond's flycatcher, Empidonax hammondii
Yellowish flycatcher, Empidonax flavescens
Buff-breasted flycatcher, Empidonax fulvifrons
Black phoebe, Sayornis nigricans
Vermilion flycatcher, Pyrocephalus rubinus
Long-tailed tyrant, Colonia colonus

Typical antbirds
Order: PasseriformesFamily: Thamnophilidae

The antbirds are a large family of small passerine birds of subtropical and tropical Central and South America. They are forest birds which tend to feed on insects at or near the ground. A sizable minority of them specialize in following columns of army ants to eat small invertebrates that leave their hiding places to flee from the ants. Many species lack bright color, with brown, black, and white being the dominant tones.

Fasciated antshrike, Cymbilaimus lineatus
Great antshrike, Taraba major
Barred antshrike, Thamnophilus doliatus
Black-crowned antshrike, Thamnophilus atrinucha
Russet antshrike, Thamnistes anabatinus
Plain antvireo, Dysithamnus mentalis
Streak-crowned antvireo, Dysithamnus striaticeps
Checker-throated stipplethroat, Epinecrophylla fulviventris
White-flanked antwren, Myrmotherula axillaris
Slaty antwren, Myrmotherula schisticolor
Dot-winged antwren, Microrhopias quixensis
Dusky antbird, Cercomacroides tyrannina
Bare-crowned antbird, Gymnocichla nudiceps
Chestnut-backed antbird, Poliocrania exsul
Spotted antbird, Hylophylax naevioides
Bicolored antbird, Gymnopithys leucaspis
Wing-banded antbird, Myrmornis torquata
Ocellated antbird, Phaenostictus mcleannani

Antpittas
Order: PasseriformesFamily: Grallariidae

Antpittas resemble the true pittas with strong, longish legs, very short tails, and stout bills.

Scaled antpitta, Grallaria guatimalensis
Streak-chested antpitta, Hylopezus perspicillatus
Thicket antpitta, Hylopezus dives

Antthrushes

Order: PasseriformesFamily: Formicariidae

Antthrushes resemble small rails with strong longish legs, very short tails, and stout bills.

Mayan antthrush, Formicarius moniliger
Black-faced antthrush, Formicarius analis

Ovenbirds and woodcreepers
Order: PasseriformesFamily: Furnariidae

Ovenbirds comprise a large family of small sub-oscine passerine bird species found in Central and South America. They are a diverse group of insectivores which gets its name from the elaborate "oven-like" clay nests built by some species, although others build stick nests or nest in tunnels or clefts in rock. The woodcreepers are brownish birds which maintain an upright vertical posture supported by their stiff tail vanes. They feed mainly on insects taken from tree trunks.

Middle American leaftosser, Sclerurus mexicanus
Scaly-throated leaftosser, Sclerurus guatemalensis
Olivaceous woodcreeper, Sittasomus griseicapillus
Long-tailed woodcreeper, Deconychura longicauda
Ruddy woodcreeper, Dendrocincla homochroa
Tawny-winged woodcreeper, Dendrocincla anabatina
Plain-brown woodcreeper, Dendrocincla fuliginosa
Wedge-billed woodcreeper, Glyphorynchus spirurus
Northern barred-woodcreeper, Dendrocolaptes sanctithomae
Black-banded woodcreeper, Dendrocolaptes picumnus
Strong-billed woodcreeper, Xiphocolaptes promeropirhynchus
Cocoa woodcreeper, Xiphorhynchus susurrans
Ivory-billed woodcreeper, Xiphorhynchus flavigaster
Spotted woodcreeper, Xiphorhynchus erythropygius
Streak-headed woodcreeper, Lepidocolaptes souleyetii
Spot-crowned woodcreeper, Lepidocolaptes affinis
Plain xenops, Xenops minutus
Buff-throated foliage-gleaner, Automolus ochrolaemus
Striped woodhaunter, Automolus subulatus
Scaly-throated foliage-gleaner, Anabacerthia variegaticeps
Ruddy foliage-gleaner, Clibanornis rubiginosus
Slaty spinetail, Synallaxis brachyura
Rufous-breasted spinetail, Synallaxis erythrothorax

Vireos, shrike-babblers, and erpornis

Order: PasseriformesFamily: Vireonidae

The vireos are a group of small to medium-sized passerine birds. They are typically greenish in color and resemble wood warblers apart from their heavier bills.
 

Rufous-browed peppershrike, Cyclarhis gujanensis
Green shrike-vireo, Vireolanius pulchellus
Tawny-crowned greenlet, Tunchiornis ochraceiceps
Lesser greenlet, Pachysylvia decurtata
White-eyed vireo, Vireo griseus
Mangrove vireo, Vireo pallens
Bell's vireo, Vireo bellii
Hutton's vireo, Vireo huttoni (H)
Yellow-throated vireo, Vireo flavifrons
Blue-headed vireo, Vireo solitarius
Plumbeous vireo, Vireo plumbeus
Warbling vireo, Vireo gilvus
Brown-capped vireo, Vireo leucophrys
Philadelphia vireo, Vireo philadelphicus
Red-eyed vireo, Vireo olivaceus
Yellow-green vireo, Vireo flavoviridis
Black-whiskered vireo, Vireo altiloquus (A)
Yucatan vireo, Vireo magister

Crows, jays, and magpies
Order: PasseriformesFamily: Corvidae

The family Corvidae includes crows, ravens, jays, choughs, magpies, treepies, nutcrackers, and ground jays. Corvids are above average in size among the Passeriformes, and some of the larger species show high levels of intelligence.

Black-throated jay, Cyanolyca pumilo
Azure-hooded jay, Cyanolyca cucullata
White-throated magpie-jay, Calocitta formosa
Brown jay, Psilorhinus morio
Green jay, Cyanocorax yncas
Bushy-crested jay, Cyanocorax melanocyaneus
Steller's jay, Cyanocitta stelleri
Unicolored jay, Aphelocoma unicolor
Common raven, Corvus corax

Swallows

Order: PasseriformesFamily: Hirundinidae

The family Hirundinidae is adapted to aerial feeding. They have a slender streamlined body, long pointed wings, and a short bill with a wide gape. The feet are adapted to perching rather than walking, and the front toes are partially joined at the base.

Bank swallow, Riparia riparia
Tree swallow, Tachycineta bicolor
Violet-green swallow, Tachycineta thalassina
Mangrove swallow, Tachycineta albilinea
Black-capped swallow, Atticora pileata
Northern rough-winged swallow, Stelgidopteryx serripennis
Southern rough-winged swallow, Stelgidopteryx ruficollis
Purple martin, Progne subis
Gray-breasted martin, Progne chalybea
Sinaloa martin, Progne sinaloae (A) (Vulnerable)
Cuban martin, Progne cryptoleuca (A)
Barn swallow, Hirundo rustica
Cliff swallow, Petrochelidon pyrrhonota
Cave swallow, Petrochelidon fulva

Waxwings
Order: PasseriformesFamily: Bombycillidae

The waxwings are a group of passerine birds with soft silky plumage and unique red tips to some of the wing feathers. In the Bohemian and cedar waxwings, these tips look like sealing wax and give the group its name. These are arboreal birds of northern forests. They live on insects in summer and berries in winter.

Cedar waxwing, Bombycilla cedrorum

Treecreepers

Order: PasseriformesFamily: Certhiidae

Treecreepers are small woodland birds, brown above and white below. They have thin, pointed, down-curved bills which they use to extricate insects from bark. They have stiff tail feathers, like woodpeckers, which they use to support themselves on vertical trees.

Brown creeper, Certhia americana

Gnatcatchers
Order: PasseriformesFamily: Polioptilidae

These dainty birds resemble Old World warblers in their build and habits, moving restlessly through the foliage seeking insects. The gnatcatchers and gnatwrens are mainly soft bluish gray in color and have the typical insectivore's long sharp bill. They are birds of fairly open woodland or scrub which nest in bushes or trees.

Long-billed gnatwren, Ramphocaenus melanurus
Slate-throated gnatcatcher, Polioptila schistaceigula (H)
White-browed gnatcatcher, Polioptila bilineata
Blue-gray gnatcatcher, Polioptila caerulea
White-lored gnatcatcher, Polioptila albiloris

Wrens
Order: PasseriformesFamily: Troglodytidae

The wrens are mainly small and inconspicuous except for their loud songs. These birds have short wings and thin down-turned bills. Several species often hold their tails upright. All are insectivorous.

Rock wren, Salpinctes obsoletus
Nightingale wren, Microcerculus philomela
House wren, Troglodytes aedon
Rufous-browed wren, Troglodytes rufociliatus
Grass wren, Cistothorus platensis
Carolina wren, Thryothorus ludovicianus
Band-backed wren, Campylorhynchus zonatus
Rufous-naped wren, Campylorhynchus rufinucha
Spot-breasted wren, Pheugopedius maculipectus
Black-throated wren, Pheugopedius atrogularis
Banded wren, Thryophilus pleurostictus
Rufous-and-white wren, Thryophilus rufalbus
Stripe-breasted wren, Cantorchilus thoracicus
Cabanis's wren, Cantorchilus modestus
Bay wren, Cantorchilus nigricapillus (H)
White-bellied wren, Uropsila leucogastra
White-breasted wood-wren, Henicorhina leucosticta
Gray-breasted wood-wren, Henicorhina leucophrys
Song wren, Cyphorhinus phaeocephalus

Mockingbirds and thrashers

Order: PasseriformesFamily: Mimidae

The mimids are a family of passerine birds that includes thrashers, mockingbirds, tremblers, and the New World catbirds. These birds are notable for their vocalizations, especially their ability to mimic a wide variety of birds and other sounds heard outdoors. Their coloring tends towards dull-grays and browns.

Blue-and-white mockingbird, Melanotis hypoleucus
Black catbird, Melanoptila glabrirostris (Near-threatened)
Gray catbird, Dumetella carolinensis
Tropical mockingbird, Mimus gilvus
Northern mockingbird, Mimus polyglottos (A)

Dippers
Order: PasseriformesFamily: Cinclidae

Dippers are a group of perching birds whose habitat includes aquatic environments in the Americas, Europe, and Asia. They are named for their bobbing or dipping movements.

American dipper, Cinclus mexicanus

Thrushes and allies
Order: PasseriformesFamily: Turdidae

The thrushes are a group of passerine birds that occur mainly in the Old World. They are plump, soft plumaged, small to medium-sized insectivores or sometimes omnivores, often feeding on the ground. Many have attractive songs.

Eastern bluebird, Sialia sialis
Brown-backed solitaire, Myadestes occidentalis
Slate-colored solitaire, Myadestes unicolor
Orange-billed nightingale-thrush, Catharus aurantiirostris
Ruddy-capped nightingale-thrush, Catharus frantzii
Black-headed nightingale-thrush, Catharus mexicanus
Yellow-throated nightingale-thrush, Catharus dryas
Veery, Catharus fuscescens
Gray-cheeked thrush, Catharus minimus
Swainson's thrush, Catharus ustulatus
Hermit thrush, Catharus guttatus (A)
Wood thrush, Hylocichla mustelina (Near-threatened)
Black thrush, Turdus infuscatus
Mountain thrush, Turdus plebejus
Clay-colored thrush, Turdus grayi
White-throated thrush, Turdus assimilis
Rufous-collared robin, Turdus rufitorques
Red-legged thrush, Turdus plumbeus (extirpated)

Olive warbler

Order: PasseriformesFamily: Peucedramidae

The olive warbler is a small passerine bird, the only member of the family Peucedramidae. It is a long-winged bird with a gray body and wings with some olive-green and two white bars. The male's head and breast are orange, the female's yellow.

Olive warbler, Peucedramus taeniatus

Waxbills and allies
Order: PasseriformesFamily: Estrildidae

The members of this family are small passerine birds native to the Old World tropics. They are gregarious and often colonial seed eaters with short thick but pointed bills. They are all similar in structure and habits, but have wide variation in plumage colors and patterns.

Scaly-breasted munia, Lonchura punctulata (I)
Tricolored munia, Lonchura malacca (I)

Old World sparrows
Order: PasseriformesFamily: Passeridae

Sparrows are small passerine birds. In general, sparrows tend to be small, plump, brown or gray birds with short tails and short powerful beaks. Sparrows are seed eaters, but they also consume small insects.

House sparrow, Passer domesticus (I)

Wagtails and pipits
Order: PasseriformesFamily: Motacillidae

Motacillidae is a family of small passerine birds with medium to long tails. They include the wagtails, longclaws, and pipits. They are slender, ground feeding insectivores of open country.

American pipit, Anthus rubescens (A)

Finches, euphonias, and allies

Order: PasseriformesFamily: Fringillidae

Finches are seed-eating passerine birds that are small to moderately large and have a strong beak, usually conical and in some species very large. All have twelve tail feathers and nine primaries. These birds have a bouncing flight with alternating bouts of flapping and gliding on closed wings, and most sing well.

Elegant euphonia, Chlorophonia elegantissima
Blue-crowned chlorophonia, Chlorophonia occipitalis
Scrub euphonia, Euphonia affinis
Yellow-crowned euphonia, Euphonia luteicapilla
White-vented euphonia, Euphonia minuta
Yellow-throated euphonia, Euphonia hirundinacea
Olive-backed euphonia, Euphonia gouldi
Hooded grosbeak, Coccothraustes abeillei
Red crossbill, Loxia curvirostra
Black-headed siskin, Spinus notata
Lesser goldfinch, Spinus psaltria

Thrush-tanager
Order: PasseriformesFamily: Rhodinocichlidae

This species was historically placed in family Thraupidae. It was placed in its own family in 2017.

Rosy thrush-tanager, Rhodinocichla rosea (A)

New World sparrows
Order: PasseriformesFamily: Passerellidae

Until 2017, these species were considered part of the family Emberizidae. Most of the species are known as sparrows, but these birds are not closely related to the Old World sparrows which are in the family Passeridae. Many of these have distinctive head patterns.

Common chlorospingus, Chlorospingus flavopectus
Stripe-headed sparrow, Peucaea ruficauda
Botteri's sparrow, Peucaea botterii
Grasshopper sparrow, Ammodramus savannarum
Green-backed sparrow, Arremonops chloronotus
Black-striped sparrow, Arremonops conirostris
Lark sparrow, Chondestes grammacus (A)
Chipping sparrow, Spizella passerina
Clay-colored sparrow, Spizella pallida (A)
Orange-billed sparrow, Arremon aurantiirostris
Chestnut-capped brushfinch, Buarremon brunneinucha
Rufous-collared sparrow, Zonotrichia capensis
White-crowned sparrow, Zonotrichia leucophrys (A)
Savannah sparrow, Passerculus sandwichensis
Lincoln's sparrow, Melospiza lincolnii
White-eared ground-sparrow, Melozone leucotis
White-faced ground-sparrow, Melozone biarcuata
Rusty sparrow, Aimophila rufescens
White-naped brushfinch, Atlapetes albinucha

Yellow-breasted chat
Order: PasseriformesFamily: Icteriidae

This species was historically placed in the wood-warblers (Parulidae) but nonetheless most authorities were unsure if it belonged there. It was placed in its own family in 2017.

Yellow-breasted chat, Icteria virens

Troupials and allies

Order: PasseriformesFamily: Icteridae

The icterids are a group of small to medium-sized, often colorful, passerine birds restricted to the New World and include the grackles, New World blackbirds, and New World orioles. Most species have black as the predominant plumage color, often enlivened by yellow, orange, or red.

Bobolink, Dolichonyx oryzivorus
Eastern meadowlark, Sturnella magna (Near-threatened)
Yellow-billed cacique, Amblycercus holosericeus
Chestnut-headed oropendola, Psarocolius wagleri
Montezuma oropendola, Gymnostinops montezuma
Scarlet-rumped cacique, Cacicus uropygialis
Black-vented oriole, Icterus wagleri
Bar-winged oriole, Icterus maculialatus
Black-cowled oriole, Icterus prosthemelas
Orchard oriole, Icterus spurius
Yellow-backed oriole, Icterus chrysater
Yellow-tailed oriole, Icterus mesomelas
Streak-backed oriole, Icterus pustulatus
Spot-breasted oriole, Icterus pectoralis
Altamira oriole, Icterus gularis
Baltimore oriole, Icterus galbula
Red-winged blackbird, Agelaius phoeniceus
Bronzed cowbird, Molothrus aeneus
Giant cowbird, Molothrus oryzivorus
Melodious blackbird, Dives dives
Great-tailed grackle, Quiscalus mexicanus

New World warblers
Order: PasseriformesFamily: Parulidae

The wood-warblers are a group of small, often colorful, passerine birds restricted to the New World. Most are arboreal, but some are terrestrial. Most members of this family are insectivores.

Ovenbird, Seiurus aurocapilla
Worm-eating warbler, Helmitheros vermivorum
Louisiana waterthrush, Parkesia motacilla
Northern waterthrush, Parkesia noveboracensis
Golden-winged warbler, Vermivora chrysoptera (Near-threatened)
Blue-winged warbler, Vermivora cyanoptera
Black-and-white warbler, Mniotilta varia
Prothonotary warbler, Protonotaria citrea
Swainson's warbler, Limnothlypis swainsonii
Crescent-chested warbler, Leiothlypis superciliosa
Tennessee warbler, Leiothlypis peregrina
Orange-crowned warbler, Leiothlypis celata
Nashville warbler, Leiothlypis ruficapilla
Connecticut warbler, Oporornis agilis (A)
Gray-crowned yellowthroat, Geothlypis poliocephala
MacGillivray's warbler, Geothlypis tolmiei
Mourning warbler, Geothlypis philadelphia
Kentucky warbler, Geothlypis formosa
Olive-crowned yellowthroat, Geothlypis semiflava
Common yellowthroat, Geothlypis trichas
American redstart, Setophaga ruticilla
Cape May warbler, Setophaga tigrina
Cerulean warbler, Setophaga cerulea (Vulnerable)
Hooded warbler, Setophaga citrina
Northern parula, Setophaga americana
Tropical parula, Setophaga pitiayumi
Magnolia warbler, Setophaga magnolia
Bay-breasted warbler, Setophaga castanea
Blackburnian warbler, Setophaga fusca
Yellow warbler, Setophaga petechia
Chestnut-sided warbler, Setophaga pensylvanica
Blackpoll warbler, Setophaga striata (Near-threatened)
Black-throated blue warbler, Setophaga caerulescens
Palm warbler, Setophaga palmarum
Pine warbler, Setophaga pinus
Yellow-rumped warbler, Setophaga coronata
Yellow-throated warbler, Setophaga dominica
Vitelline warbler, Setophaga vitellina (Near-threatened)
Prairie warbler, Setophaga discolor
Grace's warbler, Setophaga graciae
Townsend's warbler, Setophaga townsendi
Hermit warbler, Setophaga occidentalis
Golden-cheeked warbler, Setophaga chrysoparia (Endangered)
Black-throated green warbler, Setophaga virens
Fan-tailed warbler, Basileuterus lachrymosus
Rufous-capped warbler, Basileuterus rufifrons
Chestnut-capped warbler, Basileuterus delattrii
Golden-browed warbler, Basileuterus belli
Golden-crowned warbler, Basileuterus culicivorus
Buff-rumped warbler, Myiothlypis fulvicauda
Canada warbler, Cardellina canadensis
Wilson's warbler, Cardellina pusilla
Red-faced warbler, Cardellina rubrifrons
Painted redstart, Myioborus pictus
Slate-throated redstart, Myioborus miniatus

Cardinals and allies

Order: PasseriformesFamily: Cardinalidae

The cardinals are a family of passerines that are robust seed-eating birds with strong bills. They are typically associated with open woodland. The sexes usually have distinct plumages.

Hepatic tanager, Piranga flava
Summer tanager, Piranga rubra
Scarlet tanager, Piranga olivacea
Western tanager, Piranga ludoviciana
Flame-colored tanager, Piranga bidentata
White-winged tanager, Piranga leucoptera
Red-crowned ant-tanager, Habia rubica
Red-throated ant-tanager, Habia fuscicauda
Carmiol's tanager, Chlorothraupis carmioli
Black-faced grosbeak, Caryothraustes poliogaster
Northern cardinal, Cardinalis cardinalis
Rose-breasted grosbeak, Pheucticus ludovicianus
Black-headed grosbeak, Pheucticus melanocephalus
Blue seedeater, Amaurospiza concolor
Blue-black grosbeak, Cyanoloxia cyanoides
Blue bunting, Cyanocompsa parellina
Blue grosbeak, Passerina caerulea
Indigo bunting, Passerina cyanea
Painted bunting, Passerina ciris
Dickcissel, Spiza americana

Tanagers and allies
Order: PasseriformesFamily: Thraupidae

The tanagers are a large group of small to medium-sized passerine birds restricted to the New World, mainly in the tropics. Many species are brightly colored. As a family they are omnivorous, but individual species specialize in eating fruits, seeds, insects, or other types of food. Most have short, rounded wings.

Golden-hooded tanager, Stilpnia larvata
Blue-gray tanager, Thraupis episcopus
Yellow-winged tanager, Thraupis abbas
Palm tanager, Thraupis palmarum (A?) (H)
Rufous-winged tanager, Tangara lavinia
Saffron finch, Sicalis flaveola (A)
Grassland yellow-finch, Sicalis luteola
Slaty finch, Haplospiza rustica
Cinnamon-bellied flowerpiercer, Diglossa baritula
Green honeycreeper, Chlorophanes spiza
Blue-black grassquit, Volatinia jacarina
Gray-headed tanager, Eucometis penicillata
White-shouldered tanager, Loriotus luctuosus
Tawny-crested tanager, Tachyphonus delatrii
Black-throated shrike-tanager, Lanio aurantius
White-throated shrike-tanager, Lanio leucothorax
Crimson-collared tanager, Ramphocelus sanguinolentus
Scarlet-rumped tanager, Ramphocelus passerinii
Shining honeycreeper, Cyanerpes lucidus
Red-legged honeycreeper, Cyanerpes cyaneus
Blue dacnis, Dacnis cayana
Bananaquit, Coereba flaveola
Yellow-faced grassquit, Tiaris olivaceus
Thick-billed seed-finch, Sporophila funerea
Nicaraguan seed-finch, Sporophila nuttingi (A)
Variable seedeater, Sporophila corvina
Slate-colored seedeater, Sporophila schistacea
Morelet's seedeater, Sporophila morelleti
Ruddy-breasted seedeater, Sporophila minuta
Black-headed saltator, Saltator atriceps
Buff-throated saltator, Saltator maximus
Slate-colored grosbeak, Saltator grossus
Cinnamon-bellied saltator, Saltator grandis

See also
List of birds
Lists of birds by region

References

External links
Birds of Honduras - World Institute for Conservation & Environment

Honduras
Birds